Mark Ryan may refer to:

 Mark Ryan (actor) (born 1956), British film, television and theatre actor
 Mark F. Ryan (1844–1940), Irish revolutionary and author
 Mark Ryan (Australian politician) (born 1982), Labor member of the Legislative Assembly of Queensland
 Mark Ryan (guitarist) (1959–2011), guitarist for Adam and the Ants
 Mark Ryan (Wisconsin politician) (1924–1985), Wisconsin State Assemblyman
 Mark W. Ryan, music editor for film and television
 Mark Ryan, alias used by Canadian-Armenian music composer, songwriter and producer DerHova

See also
 Marc Ryan (born 1982), New Zealand cyclist